The 1957 Paris–Nice was the 15th edition of the Paris–Nice cycle race and was held from 12 March to 17 March 1957. The race started in Paris and finished in Nice. The race was won by Jacques Anquetil of the Helyett team.

General classification

References

1957
1957 in road cycling
1957 in French sport
March 1957 sports events in Europe